The following is a list of the television networks and announcers who have broadcast college football's Liberty Bowl throughout the years.

Television

Radio

References

External links
Historical Bowl Game Announcers

Liberty
Broadcasters
Liberty Bowl
Liberty Bowl
Liberty Bowl
Liberty Bowl